H. Parker Evatt (born August 27, 1935) was an American politician in the state of South Carolina. He served in the South Carolina House of Representatives from 1975 to 1982, representing Richland County, South Carolina.  From 1987 to 1995, Evatt served as the director of the South Carolina Department of Corrections.  He was an executive director of the Alston Wilkes Society.

References

1935 births
Living people
People from Richland County, South Carolina
Republican Party members of the South Carolina House of Representatives
Politicians from Greenville, South Carolina